Dukhail Al-Habashi (born 9 September 1975) is a Kuwaiti table tennis player. He competed in the 1996 Summer Olympics.

References

1975 births
Living people
Table tennis players at the 1996 Summer Olympics
Kuwaiti male table tennis players
Olympic table tennis players of Kuwait